Yun Gwan (윤관, 尹瓘; 12 July 1040 – 15 June 1111) was a Korean military general of Goryeo who was known for training the Byeolmuban and leading it to victory against the Jurchen tribes.

Family 
 Grandfather
 Yun Geum-kang (윤금강, 尹金剛)
 Father
 Yun Jib-hyeong (윤집형, 尹執衡)
Wife
 Lady Lee of the Incheon Lee clan (인천 이씨, 仁川 李氏)
 Father-in-law - Lee Seong-gan (이성간, 李成幹)
 Issue
Son - Yun Eon-in (윤언인, 尹彦仁)
 Grandson - Yun Deok-cheom (윤덕첨, 尹德瞻)
Son - Yun Eon-sun (윤언순, 尹彦純)
 Grandson - Yun Jong-cheom (윤중첨, 尹仲瞻)
 Great-Granddaughter - Lady Yun of the Papyeong Yun clan (파평 윤씨)
 Great Grandson-in-law - Bang Seo-ran (방서란, 房瑞鸞)
Son - Yun Eon-am (윤언암)
Son - Yun Eon-sik (윤언식, 尹彦植) (? - 1149)
 Daughter-in-law - Lady Hawongun of the Jeongju Ryu clan (하원군 류씨, 河源郡君 柳氏); Queen Myeongui’s younger sister
 Son - Yun Eon-yi (윤언이, 尹彦頤) (? - May 1149)
 Grandson - Yun In-cheom (윤인첨, 尹鱗瞻)
 Grandson - Yun Ja-go (윤자고, 尹子固)
 Grandson - Yun Don-shin (윤돈신, 尹敦信)
 Grandson - Yun Ja-yang (윤자양, 尹子讓)
 Grandson - Yun Don-ui (윤돈의, 尹敦義)
 Grandson - Yun Don-hyo (윤돈효)
 Granddaughter - Lady Yun of the Papyeong Yun clan (파평 윤씨)
 Granddaughter - Lady Yun of the Papyeong Yun clan (파평 윤씨)
 Granddaughter - Lady Yun of the Papyeong Yun clan (파평 윤씨)
 Granddaughter - Lady Yun of the Papyeong Yun clan (파평 윤씨)
Son - Yun Eon-min (윤언민, 尹彦旼) (1095 - 23 April 1154)
Daughter - Lady Yun of the Papyeong Yun clan 
 Son-in-law - Hwang Won-do (황원도)
Daughter - Lady Yun of the Papyeong Yun clan
 Son-in-law - Im Won-hu (임원후, 任元厚) (1089 - 1156)
 Granddaughter - Queen Gongye of the Jangheung Im clan (공예왕후 임씨) (2 October 1109 - 2 December 1183)
 Granddaughter - Lady Im of the Jangheung Im clan (장흥 임씨, 長興 任氏)
 Grandson - Im Geuk-chong (임극충, 任克忠)
 Grandson - Im Geuk-jeong (임극정, 任克正)
 Grandson - Im Bu (임부, 任溥)
 Grandson - Im Geuk-in (임극인, 任克仁) (1149 - 1212)
 Great-Grandson - Im Gyeong-suk (임경숙, 任景肅)
 Great-Grandson - Im Gyeong-gyeom (임경겸, 任景謙)
 Great-Grandson - Im Hyo-sun (임효순, 任孝順)
 Great-Grandson - Im Gyeong-sun (임경순, 任景恂)
 Grandson - Im Hang (임항, 任沆) (? - November 1191)

Early life     
Yun was born as a descendant of Yun Shin-dal. He passed the civil service exam during the reign of Munjong. In 1087, Yun became a Chulchusa, and inspected Gwangju, Cheongju, and Chungju. When Sukjong became the new King, Yun was sent to Liao dynasty to notify Sukjong's coronation. In 1098, Yun went to an ambassador of Song dynasty, and told the information Sukjong's coronation.

The Jurchen Expedition 
Jurchen tribes lived to the north of Goryeo. The Jurchens always rendered tribute to the Kings of Goryeo, but the Jurchen tribes grew strong, and were soon united under Wanyan. They began to violate the Goryeo-Jurchen borders, and eventually invaded Goryeo. Goryeo, however, did not have a powerful army at that time, due in part to a century of peaceful existence. With the invasion of the Jurchen, King Sukjong ordered all available soldiers into battle, but this ended in defeat. General Yun Gwan convinced the Jurchen leaders to pull their troops back, and this ended the invasion of the Jurchen.

Victory over the Jurchen 
After experiencing the invasion by the Jurchen, Yun Gwan realized that Goryeo lacked efficient cavalry units, and requested permission from King Sukjong to train and reorganize the current Goryeo military into a professional army that would contain decent and well-trained cavalry units. Finally, in 1107, General Yun led the newly formed Goryeo army, a force of approximately 170 thousand men called Byeolmuban, and attacked the Jurchens tribes. Though the war lasted for several years, the Jurchen were ultimately defeated, and surrendered to Yun Gwan. To mark the victory, General Yun built nine fortresses to the northeast of the Goryeo-Jurchen borders (Hangul:동북 9성, Hanja:東北 九城). In 1108, however, General Yun was given orders to withdraw his troops by Goryeo's new ruler, King Yejong. After the war, Yun brought 346 prisoners, 96 horses, and about 300 cows.

Due to manipulation and court-intrigue from opposing factions, he was discharged from his post. Along with this, the opposing factions fought to make sure that the new nine fortresses were returned to the Jurchens. Soon after, Yun Gwan was released from his prison in 1110, and was offered a chance to return to his duties as general, but he gently refused and returned to his hometown. A year later, in 1111, Yun Gwan died.

Aftermath 
After the death of Yun Gwan, the Jurchen destroyed the Liao dynasty, and established the Jin dynasty. With the rise of the Jin, Goryeo was no longer able to trade with the Song Dynasty
or any of the other neighboring nations, and became isolated, which contributed to the weakening of the kingdom.

Dispute 
The extent of Yun Gwan's military campaigns has been in dispute for centuries. While the general belief is that his nine fortresses were built in present-day Hamheung in North Korea, a number of historical sources seem to indicate that Yun took parts of Manchuria for Goryeo, temporarily claiming the land of Goryeo's ancestors, Goguryeo.

Family Feud 
Due to wars and invasions, the location of Yun Gwan's tomb was lost until the 18th century.  Yun Gwan's tomb was located near another tomb belonging to the Sim clan.  Because of this a family feud erupted between the Yuns and Sims lasting 300 years.

See also
 History of Korea
 Military history of Korea
 Yejong of Goryeo

References

External links 
 South Korean Cultural Heritage Administration
 Quest for perfect grave keeps Korean feud alive
 The 5 Most Epic Battles of Will That Would Not End
 Feuding Korean clans end 400-year fight over graves
 Quest for perfect grave keeps Korean feud alive - Asia - Pacific - International Herald Tribune

12th-century Korean people
1040 births
1111 deaths
Korean generals
Papyeong Yun clan